The China women's national futsal team represents China in international futsal competitions and is controlled by the Chinese Football Association.

Tournament record

Futsal at the Asian Indoor and Martial Arts Games

AFC Women's Futsal Championship

Recent Matches

Managers

References

See also
 China national men's futsal team
 Chinese Futsal League

Asian women's national futsal teams
women
2013 establishments in China
futsal
Women's football in China